Sodium orthovanadate is the inorganic compound with the chemical formula . It forms a dihydrate . Sodium orthovanadate is a salt of the  oxyanion. It is a colorless, water-soluble solid.

Synthesis and structure
Sodium orthovanadate is produced by dissolving vanadium(V) oxide in a solution of sodium hydroxide:

The salt features tetrahedral  anion centers linked to octahedral  cation sites.

Condensation equilibria
Like many oxometalates, orthovanadate is subject to a number of reactions, which have been analyzed by 51V NMR studies. At lower pH's, condensation ensues to give various polyoxovanadates. Ultimately, decavanadate is formed.

Biochemistry
Vanadates exhibit a variety of biological activities, in part because they serve as structural mimics of phosphates. It acts as a competitive inhibitor of ATPases, alkaline and acid phosphatases, and protein-phosphotyrosine phosphatases, and its inhibitory effects can be reversed by dilution or the addition of ethylenediaminetetraacetic acid (EDTA).

Orthovanadate is activated by boiling and adjusting pH to ~10; this depolymerizes decavanadate into the active inhibitor, monovanadate.

References

See also
Sodium metavanadate

Inorganic compounds
Sodium compounds
Vanadates